South Branch Bowman Creek (also known as Cherry Run) is a tributary of Bowman Creek in Luzerne County, Pennsylvania, in the United States. The surficial geology in its vicinity consists of alluvial fan, alluvium, Wisconsinan Ice-Contact Sratified Drift, fill, lakes, Boulder Colluvium, Wisconsinan Till, Wisconsinan Bouldery Till, wetlands, and bedrock. Most of the creek is in Ricketts Glen State Park. It has one named tributary, which is known as Cherry Run. The creek's watershed is designated as a High-Quality Coldwater Fishery and a Migratory Fishery.

Course
South Branch Bowman Creek begins in a wetland in Fairmount Township. It flows north for several hundred feet before flowing in an easterly direction for several tenths of a mile. The creek then turns north for several tenths of a mile before heading east-northeast. In this reach, it receives Cherry Run, its only named tributary, from the left. It then turns east-southeast before turning east-northeast again and passing through Mount Spring Lake. From the eastern end of the lake, the creek flows east-northeast for a few tenths of a mile before reaching its confluence with Bowman Creek.

Tributaries
South Branch Bowman Creek has one named tributary, which is known as Cherry Run.

Geography and geology

The surficial geology in the lower reaches of the valley of South Branch Bowman Creek mainly consists of alluvium, alluvial fan, Wisconsinan Ice-Stratified Drift, and a lake. However, there is also fill and Boulder Colluvium, which is rich in boulders containing quartz, sandstone, or conglomerate. The creek's valley is the only place in the Sweet Valley quadrangle with the exception of the valley of North Branch Bowman Creek. Further upstream in the valley, there is Wiscoinsnan Bouldery Till, more Boulder Colluvium, and a patch of Wisconsinan Till. The valley walls have surficial geology consisting of bedrock made of sandstone and shale. In the creek's upper reaches, the surficial geology along it mainly consists of Wisconsinan Bouldery Till, Wisconsinan Till, and wetlands.

In preglacial times, the area that is now Lake Leigh and part of Lake Jean drained into South Branch Bowman Creek. However, glacial action caused them to become part of the watershed of Kitchen Creek. There used to be a glacial lake in the valley of South Branch Bowman Creek.

Hydrology and watershed
The mouth of the creek is in the United States Geological Survey quadrangle of Sweet Valley. However, its source is in the quadrangle of Red Rock. The mouth of the creek is located at Mountain Springs.

Most of the length of South Branch Bowman Creek is in Ricketts Glen State Park, but its lower reaches (including Mount Springs Lake) are on land owned by the Pennsylvania Fish and Boat Commission. Hunting is permitted along all of the creek that is in Ricketts Glen State Park, except for the headwaters area.

In the 1980s, South Branch Bowman Creek was found to have high levels of acidity.

History and recreation
South Branch Bowman Creek was entered into the Geographic Names Information System on August 2, 1979. Its identifier in the Geographic Names Information System is 1188015. South Branch Bowman Creek is also known as Cherry Run. This variant name appears in a 1953 map by the United States Geological Survey. However, it was realized in 1969 that this variant name was erroneous.

A hiking trail known as the Cherry Run Trail crosses South Branch Bowman Creek in Ricketts Glen State Park. Another hiking trail, the Mountain Springs Trail, is also in the creek's vicinity.

Biology
The drainage basin of South Branch Bowman Creek is designated as a High-Quality Coldwater Fishery and a Migratory Fishery. Wild trout naturally reproduce in the creek from its headwaters downstream to its mouth.

See also
Bean Run, next tributary of Bowman Creek going downstream
North Branch Bowman Creek
List of rivers of Pennsylvania
List of tributaries of Bowman Creek

References

Rivers of Luzerne County, Pennsylvania
Tributaries of Bowman Creek
Rivers of Pennsylvania